The Precious History is the greatest hits compilation (and 3.5) studio album by SG Wannabe. SG Wannabe released a greatest hits compilation entitled SG Wannabe Best Album - The Precious History. It was a collection of their favorite songs from the past three albums and also included three new songs. However, despite having high sales and topping the charts, they did not win another, though the group was nominated for Daesang. The album has sold 149,257 copies.

Music videos
They released a music video for the tracks "Song of Love" ("사랑가") featuring Vibe, "Even If I Could See You" ("그저 바라볼 수만 있어도"), and "Ordinary People" featuring Hoo Ni-Hoon, Min Kyung-Hoon, and Jang Hye-Jin. The music video was released in two parts—one for "Ordinary People" and the other for "Song of Love". The music videos starred Lee Beom-soo and former SeeYa member Nam Gyu-ri.

Track listing

CD 1

CD 2

CD 3

References

SG Wannabe albums
Stone Music Entertainment albums
2006 albums